Eucalyptus melanophloia, commonly known as silver-leaved ironbark, is a species of tree that is endemic to northeastern Australia. It is a small to medium-sized tree with rough, hard ironbark on the trunk and branches. The crown is usually composed of juvenile leaves that are dull, glaucous, sessile and arranged in opposite pairs. The flower buds are arranged in groups of seven, the flowers white and the fruit cup-shaped to hemispherical.

Description
It has hard, rough, dark grey to black bark on the trunk and branches. Flowering has been recorded in January and February, and from June to August.

Taxonomy and naming
Eucalyptus melanophloia was first formally described in 1859 by Ferdinand von Mueller and the description was published in the Journal of the Proceedings of the Linnean Society, Botany. The specific epithet is derived from ancient Greek and means "black bark".

Distribution and habitat
The silver-leaved ironbark grows in woodland on plains and tablelands in the eastern half of Queensland south from Mareeba, on the western side of the Great Dividing Range in New South Wales north from Dubbo and in a few isolated locations in the Northern Territory.

Conservation status
This eucalypt is classified as "least concern" under the Queensland Government Nature Conservation Act 1992.

Gallery

References

melanophloia
Trees of Australia
Myrtales of Australia
Flora of New South Wales
Flora of Queensland
Flora of the Northern Territory
Drought-tolerant trees
Taxa named by Ferdinand von Mueller